Barrachois is a small community in the Canadian province of Nova Scotia, located in Colchester County just east of the village of Tatamagouche and is the home of the Barrachois Harbour Yacht Club as well as a fishing wharf and launch ramp for pleasure craft.

References 
Barrachois Nova Scotia

Communities in Colchester County